Muni is an Indian horror comedy film series created and directed by Raghava Lawrence who also appeared in lead roles in all the films. The first film is Muni (2007) and the second is Muni 2: Kanchana (2011) with the third installment of the franchise titled Muni 3: Kanchana 2: Ganga (2015). The latest movie, the fourth instalment is Muni 4: Kanchana 3 (2019). and stars Raghava Lawrence and Kovai Sarala with Rajkiran, Sarathkumar, Devadarshini, Sriman, Vedhika, Vinu Chakravarthy, Raai Laxmi, Nithya Menon, Taapsee, Renuka, Oviya, Nikki Tamboli, Alexandra Ri Djavi. All films were successful at the box office, continuing the trend of the comedy-horror genre in Tamil cinema that began with Chandramukhi (2005).

All four films revolve around the same plot of a coward who gets possessed by a ghost to take revenge on the people who killed them, rest of the films shows how he takes revenge. Raghava Lawrence and Kovai Sarala are the only actors to appear in every installment of the series.

Synopsis

Muni (2007) 

A young man, along with his wife and his parents, migrates to Chennai where he gets possessed by the spirit of a kind-hearted person who was murdered by an ambitious and corrupt political leader.

Muni 2:Kanchana 

When three spirits possess a timid young man and start making him act like a woman, his mother consults an exorcist who unearths a heartbreaking tale of societal injustice, murder and vengeance.

Muni 3: Kanchana 2 

A cameraman is petrified of ghosts but obliges when his director proposes a show on ghosts to revive their TV channel. However, strange things happen when they start working on the show.

Muni 4: Kanchana 3 

Raghava is a young man who lives happily with his family but is scared of ghosts. When he visits Coimbatore with his family, he is possessed by a vengeful ghost with a sinister past.

Muni 5: Kanchana 4 

Coming Soon

Films

Muni (2007) 

The first installment of the series, based on fictional incidents. A young man, along with his wife and his parents, migrates to Chennai where he gets possessed by the spirit of a kind-hearted person who was murdered by an ambitious and corrupt political leader. Muni was released on 9 March 2007 and gained positive response. It earned ₹15 crore against a budget of ₹4 crore.

Kanchana 

After the success of Muni Raghava and Sarala Re-unite once again for sequel. The film was titled as Muni 2: Kanchana and also second installment in this series. The film was released on 22 July 2011 worldwide. The film's soundtrack was composed by S. Thaman. Kanchana opened to mostly positive reviews. The film grossed ₹68 crore worldwide becoming the second highest grossing Tamil film of 2011.

Kanchana 2 

A stand-alone sequel, Muni 3: Kanchana 2, was commissioned after the success of the previous films and was also directed by Raghava. It stars Raghava, Taapsee and Sarala in lead roles. And also the third installment in this series. It was released on 17 April 2015 in around 750 screens worldwide alongside Mani Ratnam's O Kadhal Kanmani. The Telugu version titled Ganga was released later on 1 May 2015 in around 550 screens. Film received positive response from audience. Proving to be similarly successful to the first entry in the series, the film emerged as a huge box office success, becoming the third highest grossing Tamil film of 2015.

Kanchana 3 

The fourth installment in this series, written and directed by Raghava. The film was titled as Naagaa, then changed to Muni 4: Kanchana 3, produced by Sun Pictures. The film stars Raghava in a dual role with Oviya, Vedhika, Nikki Tamboli, Keerthi Pandian and Ri Djavi Alexandra. While Kovai Sarala, Soori, Tarun Arora, and Kabir Duhan Singh play supporting roles. Kanchana 3 was released on Good Friday in 2019. The film received mixed reviews from audiences, comparisons of Kanchana 1 and 2. It earned ₹130 crore worldwide against a budget of ₹20 crore, becoming one of the fourth highest grossing Tamil film of 2019.

Future films

Durga (2023) 

A spin-off, Durga ,was commissioned after the success of the previous film and directed by renowned stunt masters Anbarivu. It is a directional debut for the twins. The film stars Raghava Lawrence, Kovai Sarala, Sriman and Devadarshini in lead roles. The film will release theatrically worldwide in summer 2023.

Recurring cast and characters 
This table lists the main characters who appear in the Muni film series.

Additional crew and production details

Release and Revenue

Box office performance 
The franchise has been notable for its profit, with Muni and its follow-up having earned a combined profit of ₹333.7 crore, according to IBtimes.

Remakes

Legacy 
Along with Chandramukhi (2005), Muni became a trendsetter for horror comedy films. The success of the film inspired several other horror comedy films including the Aranmanai film series (2014) and Darling (2015).

References 

Horror film series
Indian comedy films
Indian comedy horror films
Indian film series